Get Tough: The Best of the Del-Lords a greatest hits compilation by The Del-Lords, released in 1999 through Restless Records.

Track listing 
All songs written by Scott Kempner, except where noted.

Personnel 
The Del-Lords
Scott Kempner – lead vocals, guitar
Eric Ambel – guitar, vocals
Manny Caiati – bass guitar, vocals
Frank Funaro – drums, vocals

Additional CD credits
Pat Benatar - background vocals
Snooky & Tish Bellamo - background vocals
Lenny Castro - percussion
Saul Davis - compilation director
Neil Giraldo - producer
Charlie Giordano - keyboards
Frank Linx - background vocals
Thom Panunzio - producer
Lou Whitney - producer

References 

1999 greatest hits albums
The Del-Lords albums
Restless Records compilation albums